Laing, is a Filipino dish of shredded or whole taro leaves with meat or seafood cooked in thick coconut milk spiced with labuyo chili, lemongrass, garlic, shallots, ginger, and shrimp paste. It originates from the Bicol Region, where it is known simply as pinangat. Laing is also a type of ginataan (Filipino dishes cooked in coconut milk), and thus may also be referred to as ginataang laing. Laing is commonly eaten as a vegetable side to complement meat or fish side dishes known as ulam in Filipino, which is normally paired with boiled white rice.

Names
Laing is the name of the dish in most parts of the Philippines However, in the Bicol region, where it originates from, it is simply called pinangat. This name can be confused with pinangat na isda, which is a different dish made with fish cooked in a slightly sour broth similar to sinigang. The confusion stems from the original meaning of the verb pangat in the languages of Southern Luzon, which simply means to cook fish or meat in a broth of water and salt.

Laing is typical of Bicolano cuisine, which is known for their common use of chilis and coconut milk. Laing is also known as ginataang laing, pinangat na laing, pinangat na gabi and ginat-ang gabi, among other names.

Description

The original laing from the Bicol Region does not use shredded taro leaves, but rather a whole taro leaf (natong in Bicolano). This version is the one most commonly referred to as pinangat. The mixture usually consists of cubed pre-cooked pork, shrimp, or fish flakes (or all three) with bagoong alamang (shrimp paste), crushed labuyo chili, garlic, shallots, ginger, and kakang gata (coconut cream). It is wrapped with the leaf and tied with a coconut leaf midrib or twine. It is then steamed in gata (coconut milk) with a knot of tanglad (lemongrass) until the leaf pouches are fork tender and the coconut milk is reduced to a thick sauce.

For the laing version served in Manila and elsewhere, it is cooked similarly, but with the leaves shredded. It also usually includes chopped leaf stalks. Laing is usually eaten with white rice, but it can also be eaten sandwiched in bread like pandesal or used as a stuffing for other dishes. It is also commonly eaten as a side dish to meat.

The taro leaves to be used for laing must be prepared correctly, as they contain amounts of calcium oxalate crystals (raphides) that can sometimes cause itching and burning sensations in the mouth. They are usually washed and cooked thoroughly to avoid this. Drying can also lessen the amount of crystals.

Variants
Notable variants of laing include:

Inulukan
Inulukan or inulokan is a variant of laing made from the meat of river crabs (uluk or ulok) wrapped in whole taro leaves and cooked in coconut milk spiced with calamansi, black pepper, and lemongrass. It is a specialty of Camalig, Albay. It is also known as pinangat na ugama or pinangat na talangka, from ugama and talangka, other local terms for river crabs.

Linapay
Linapay also known as tinamuk, is a related dish from Aklan in the Western Visayas. It is made from pounded freshwater shrimp (ueang) mixed with gawud (grated young coconut meat) and wrapped with taro leaves (gutaw) and cooked in coconut milk.

Tinumok
Tinumok, tinomok, or tinulmok is another traditional variant from Bicol which uses whole taro leaves wrapped around a mixture of freshwater shrimp, fish flakes (and sometimes meat), shrimp paste, with minced or grated coconut meat, onions, chilis, lemongrass, garlic, and other spices cooked in coconut milk. It differs primarily in its use of coconut meat.

See also

Sarsa na uyang
Ginataan
Binalot
Piaparan
Paksiw
Cuisine of the Philippines
 Callaloo, a similar native dish from the Caribbean
 Laulau, similar native dishes from Polynesia

References

Philippine stews
Taro dishes
Chili pepper dishes
Spicy foods
Foods containing coconut